The Men's 10 kilometre sprint biathlon competition at the 1984 Winter Olympics was held on 14 February, at Igman - Veliko Polke. Competitors raced over three loops of the skiing course, shooting two times, once prone and once standing. Each miss was penalized by requiring the competitor to race over a 150-metre penalty loop.

Summary 

Eirik Kvalfoss, the two-time defending world champion in the sprint, had had the fastest ski time in the individual race, but struggled with his shooting, ending up with bronze. He had no such problems in the sprint, as he missed two shots, but was able to make up for it with his ski speed, being the only man to get below 31 minutes. Peter Angerer, the individual champion, missed just once to win silver, as he did in the 1983 worlds, while Matthias Jacob shot clear to win bronze.

Results

References

Men's sprint